And We Wept the Black Ocean Within is the first studio album by American post-metal band A Storm of Light.

Track listing

References 

A Storm of Light albums
2008 albums